Simón Bolívar University, also known as Unisimón, is a university located in Barranquilla, with a campus in Cúcuta,  Colombia, subject to inspection and monitoring by Law 1740 of 2014 and Law 30 of 1992 of the Ministry of Education of Colombia. It has the institutional accreditation of High Quality granted by the Ministry of Education of Colombia, being the third institution of Barranquilla together with the North University and the Free University to receive this recognition.

The university was founded by an outstanding character from the Atlantic Coast called José Consuegra Higgins in 1972.

The institution has 20 undergraduate programs, 23 specializations, 17 master's degrees and 4 doctorates, for a total of 64 academic programs. It is one of the four universities, next to the North University, the University of Atlántico and the University of the Coast in offering doctoral programs.

José Consuegra Higgins Theater 
The university center has the José Consuegra Higgins Theater, a modern venue where special ceremonies, degrees, and other academic events are held. On November 7, 2008 it was inaugurated by former Colombian President Alvaro Uribe.

Business Merit Award 
The Business Merit Award is an important award given annually by Simon Bolivar University to all those entities or individuals that have contributed positively to business development. The award is supported by various Colombian entities such as the Mayor's Office and the Chamber of Commerce of Barranquilla, the Government of the Atlantic, the Colombian Institute of Technical Standards and Certification (ICONTEC) and other business associations.

Academics

Undergraduate

References

External links 
 Official University Website 

Universities and colleges in Colombia
Private universities and colleges in Colombia
Educational institutions established in 1972
Barranquilla
Cúcuta
Buildings and structures in Atlántico Department
Buildings and structures in Norte de Santander Department